In Latin, Soranus is an adjectival toponym indicating origin from the town of Sora.

Name
The name Soranus may refer to:
 Soranus of Ephesus, Greek physician and medical writer
 Soranus (mythology), a god adopted by the ancient Romans
 Quintus Valerius Soranus, Roman author and tribune, ostensibly executed for revealing the arcane name of Rome
 Quintus Marcius Barea Soranus, Roman consul in 34 AD
 Quintus Marcius Barea Soranus, Roman consul in 52 AD and son of the consul of 34 AD

Pen-name
 Soranus was used as a pen-name by Voltaire